The 2022 Wheelchair Rugby World Championship was the 8th international championship for wheelchair rugby. It was held at the DGI-Huset recreational centre in Vejle, Denmark from 10–16 October 2022 and contested by the world's top twelve national teams. The tournament was won by Australia, defeating United States in the final by 58–55 to claim their second title.

Tournament
Twelve teams contested the 2022 Wheelchair Rugby World Championship. The preliminary rounds consisted of a group stage where the teams were split into two leagues which were contested as a round-robin. This was then followed by a round of crossover matches that determined the semi-finalists.

Preliminary round

Pool A

Pool B

Classification rounds

9th - 12th places

5th - 8th places

Medals round

References

2022
2022 in wheelchair rugby
wheelchair rugby
International rugby union competitions hosted by Denmark
IWRF